A vehicle vinyl wrap describes the automotive aftermarket practice of completely or partially covering a vehicle's original paint with a vinyl wrap. Generally this vinyl wrap will be a different color or finish like a gloss, matte or clear protective layer. Other terms used to refer to vehicle vinyl wrap are car wrap, paint wrap, color change wrap, vehicle graphics, and paint protection film.

History 
Vehicle vinyl wrap and color change wrap grew in popularity out of the wrap advertising business. A large milestone in the shift from small production vinyl lettering to a full vehicle vinyl color change took place in Germany in 1993 when the vinyl manufacturer Kay Premium Marking Films (KPMF) was asked to produce a film to be used in place of paint for the purpose of converting cars into taxis. At this time, German taxi companies were required by law to paint their fleets in a government-mandated color, beige. KPMF provided an alternative to painting, which allowed taxi companies to bring a large fleet of vehicles into compliance with German law while maintaining the future resale value of the vehicle. Prior to this point, decommissioned taxis were heavily discounted or had to be completely repainted. With the use of vinyl vehicle wraps, there was no need to repaint them or discount them as the vinyl could be removed without damaging the paint underneath. KPMF documented after 3 years of taxi service was complete, the vinyl was removed leaving a "pristine and unscratched paint surface".

Wrap installers that performed advertising vinyl, began to offer accent and full vinyl wraps as a cosmetic enhancement. Vehicle owners correspondingly drove demand and requested vinyl wraps that suited their desires. Rather than advertise a company or brand, vehicle owners wanted to change the color and finish of their vehicle for cosmetic or protective purposes. Manufacturers of vinyl wrap followed this trend by producing more colors and easier to install durable materials.

One of the earliest cosmetic vinyl treatments dates to the 1950s and an aftermarket product by Newhouse Automotive Industries of Los Angeles, California. Costs for DIY partial decorative (plaid or polka dot) vinyl treatments ranged from $10-$20.

The Newhouse Automotive ads described vinyl as the "very latest automotive sensation:" vehicle wraps. The Newhouse ads began in 1954.

By 2017, color change vinyl wraps, paint color matching vinyl wraps, and overlaminates evolved to include complex and creative graphic designs and advanced colors. Metallic, chrome, color shifting and even vinyl wraps that match OEM paint code colors are available.

Color Change and "Paint Wrap" is a term used by wrap installers and refers to a full-color change, as if one were 'painting' a car with a vinyl wrap. Demand for color matching vinyl wrap has grown. The wrap is manufactured to match vehicle paint colors and metallics, as well as in colors used in print such as Pantone colors. Most color change wraps are done to the exterior of a vehicle. Wrap Installers can also wrap the door jams, inner parts of the doors that show, and other parts (these parts add additional cost to a wrap installation).

Types of vinyl wrap 
There are three main types of vinyl wrap for automotive vehicles:
 Cut Graphics – these are individual graphics applied to the vehicle, i.e. logos, services or contact details.
 Half Wraps – This can be a design that incorporates a larger graphic that can create more impact for example a large color image. It covers half the vehicle which includes the back doors.
 Full Wraps – a full wrap covers the complete vehicle and can be any design.

Technologies 

Cast vinyl is the most common material used in color change wraps. Cast vinyl starts as a liquid and is cast into a sheet or form and then processed through ovens, evaporating solvents in the liquid. When the solvents evaporate, the remainder forms a solid film. Cast films conform well to curved shapes and strongly retain their original shape. This durability of shape allows for predictability on application and in applying heat to relax the material back to its natural form after modest stretching. Cast vinyl is less prone to shrinkage because stress (such as extrusion as in calendared films) is not applied to the material during the manufacturing process.

See also 
 Decal

References

Automotive accessories